The Way It Is ... is the comeback album by blues guitarist Snowy White, featuring his band, The White Flames, with two new 2004 members: Max Middleton and Richard Bailey, released in 2005 by his Record Company: White Flames Records. It was recorded between 2001 & 2005, featuring early White Flames drummer Juan Van Emmerloot and keyboardist John "Rabbit" Bundrick, .

This is the new album including a new acoustic version of the 1983 hit, "Bird of Paradise", and a blues version of Peter Green's "Black Magic Woman".

Track listing
All songs by Snowy White, except where noted.

 "No Stranger to the Blues" (Snowy White/Gilchrist/Gil Marais) – 3:24
 "Bird of Paradise" – 3:43
 "Black Magic Woman" (Peter Green) – 3:17
 "What I'm Searching For" – 5:17
 "Angel Inside You (Part 1)" – 4:08
 "Angel Inside You (Part 2)" – 5:17
 "Falling" – 4:24
 "The Way It Is" – 3:48
 "A Piece of your Love" – 3:51
 "This Time of My Life" – 4:38
 "Easy" (Snowy White/Walter Latupeirissa/Juan Van Emmerloot) – 3:25
 "Sweet Bluesmaker" – 5:26

Personnel

Snowy White & The White Flames
Snowy White: Guitars, bass guitar, keyboards, piano, percussion, congas, vocals.
Walter Latupeirissa: Bass guitar, guitars, keyboards, percussion, vocals.
Max Middleton: Keyboards, piano, Hammond Organ.
Richard Bailey: Drums, percussion, congas, shakers, synthesizer, Bodhran (Tracks 4-12).

Guest musicians
Kuma Harada: Bass guitar, guitars, percussion, keyboards.
John "Rabbit" Bundrick: Keyboards, organ, piano.
Juan Van Emmerloot: Percussion, congas, maracas (Tracks 1-3).
Orlando Sandoval: Piano, keyboards (Tracks 2-3).
James Lascelles: Keyboards, Hammond organ.
Dawn Knight: Backing vocals.
Ray Carless: Sax.

Production
Snowy White: Producer.
Kuma Harada: Engineer.
Noel Haris: Engineer.
Curtis Schwartz: Engineer.
Denis Blackham: Mastering.

References

Snowy White albums
2005 albums